Mircea Teodor Oltean (born 8 January 1982) is a Romanian former footballer, who played as a goalkeeper.

External links
 
 
 

1982 births
Living people
Sportspeople from Târgu Mureș
Romanian footballers
Association football goalkeepers
Liga I players
FC Dinamo București players
FC Politehnica Timișoara players
FC Unirea Urziceni players
CS Mioveni players
Liga II players
FC Universitatea Cluj players
ASA 2013 Târgu Mureș players
ACS Sticla Arieșul Turda players
CS Otopeni players